Fazakerley is a suburb of Liverpool, Merseyside, England.

Fazakerley also refers to:

 Dixons Fazakerley Academy, a secondary school
 Fazakerley railway station
 Fazakerley (ward), a Liverpool City Council ward
 New Hall, Fazakerley 
 ROF Fazakerley, an ordnance factory

People with the surname
 Nicholas Fazakerley (1685?–1767), English lawyer and politician
 John Nicholas Fazakerley (1787–1852), British politician

See also
 Fazackerley (surname)